Schoettler is a surname. Notable people with the surname include:

Doris Schoettler-Boll (1945–2015), German artist
Gail Schoettler (born 1943), American politician and businesswoman

See also
Schoettle

German-language surnames